Cuba Gooding may refer to:

 Cuba Gooding Sr. (19442017), American singer; father of Cuba Gooding Jr.
 Cuba Gooding Jr. (born 1968), American actor; son of Cuba Gooding Sr.